Arifureta: From Commonplace to World's Strongest is an anime series based on the light novel series of the same name written by Ryo Shirakome and illustrated by Takayaki. The series adaptation was announced on December 3, 2017, and was initially intended to premiere in April 2018, but on January 15, 2018, its release was pushed back due to "various circumstances". Originally, the series would have been directed by Jun Kamiya and written by Kazuyuki Fudeyasu, with animation by studio White Fox and character designs by Atsuo Tobe, who also would have served as chief animation director. However, following the postponement, it was announced on April 29, 2018, that Kinji Yoshimoto would be taking over as director and studio Asread would be joining White Fox as animators. Additionally, Chika Kojima took over from Atsuo Tobe as character designer to adapt Takayaki's original designs, and Kazuyuki Fudeyasu left his position as scriptwriter, being replaced by Shōichi Satō and Kinji Yoshimoto. Ryō Takahashi is composing the series' music. The opening theme is "FLARE" by Void_Chords feat.

The series aired from July 8 to October 7, 2019, on AT-X, Tokyo MX, SUN, and BS11. It ran for 13 episodes. Two original video animations (OVA) was released with the second and third home video sets on December 25, 2019, and February 26, 2020. Funimation has licensed the series for an English simulcast and simuldub.

After the first season's finale, it was announced that the series will receive a second season. Akira Iwanaga replaced Kinji Yoshimoto as director, and Studio Mother replaced White Fox as the secondary studio. The rest of the staff and cast returned to reprise their roles. It aired from January 13 to March 31, 2022, on AT-X, Tokyo MX, and BS11. A new OVA was released on September 25, 2022.

On September 10, 2022, it was announced that a third season is in production. Asread is animating the season, with Akira Iwanaga, Shoichi Sato, and Chika Kojima returning as director, scriptwriter, and character designer, respectively.

Series overview

Episode list

Season 1 (2019)

Season 2 (2022)

Notes

References

Arifureta: From Commonplace to World's Strongest